Hakuoki: OVA 2021 is three-part OVA adaptation in the continuing anime series of Hakuoki. The events follow on from Season 3 Hakuoki: Dawn of the Shinsengumi and the story centers on a plot to assassinate the shogun by a group of ronin supported by the Tosa clan who attempt to discredit the Shinsengumi, including Chizuru's twin brother Kaoru Nagumo who impersonates her. It also introduces the Shinsengumi treasurer Sakai who is injured defending Chizuru and later becomes a Fury after being given the Water of Life.

The anime is produced by Studio Deen and the OVAs were released by U-NEXT between November 13, 2021, and January 29, 2022. The staff from the previous series return to produce the episodes.

The opening theme song is "Setsuna no Kodō" (Split-Second Heartbeat) performed by Aiko Yoshioka and the ending theme song "Kenran -I'll never forget you-." by Maon Kurosaki.

Episode list

References

External links
 Official website (anime)
 

2021 anime OVAs
2022 anime OVAs
Hakuoki episode lists
Studio Deen